Ramya Nambeesan is an Indian actress,  who primarily works in Malayalam cinema.

Early life and family
Ramya Nambeesan was born in Chottanikkara, Cochin, Kerala to Subrahmaniam Unni and Jayasree. Her father is a former theatre artiste, who was an active member of troupes such as "Jubilee" and "Harishree". She has a brother, Rahul, who has worked as the music director in the Malayalam movie Philips and the Monkey Pen and as a playback singer in the film Thattathin Marayathu. She attended the Mahatma Gandhi Public School, Ambadimala near Chottanikkara. She graduated with a bachelor's degree in Communicative English from St. Teresa's College, Ernakulam.

Career
Ramya started her career as  minor supporting roles in the following years in films including Sathyan Anthikad's satire film Narendran Makan Jayakanthan Vaka (2001) and Gramophone (2003).

She played her first and only leading role till date, as a bold dance teacher, is in the 2006 film Aanachandam.
 

She was seen in Bachelor Party (2012)  and Ivan Megharoopan (2012) featured her in a cameo appearance. She also signed up Saji Surendran's comedy film Husbands in Goa (2012). and  Oru Yathrayil (2013).

Other work

She was a host before acting. she has sung  for devotional albums on Chottanikarai Bhagavathi.

Filmography

Discography

References

External links

 
 

Living people
Actresses from Kochi
21st-century Indian child actresses
Indian women television presenters
Indian television presenters
Actresses in Malayalam cinema
Actresses in Tamil cinema
21st-century Indian actresses
Actresses in Malayalam television
Indian television actresses
Indian women comedians
Child actresses in Malayalam cinema
Child actresses in Tamil cinema
Indian film actresses
Tamil playback singers
Malayalam playback singers
Indian women playback singers
21st-century Indian singers
People from Ernakulam district
Singers from Kochi
21st-century Indian women singers
Women musicians from Kerala
Year of birth missing (living people)
Actresses in Telugu cinema
Actresses in Kannada cinema
St. Teresa's College alumni